The 1st United States Congress, comprising the United States Senate and the United States House of Representatives, met from March 4, 1789, to March 4, 1791, during the first two years of George Washington's presidency, first at Federal Hall in New York City and later at Congress Hall in Philadelphia. With the initial meeting of the First Congress, the United States federal government officially began operations under the new (and current) frame of government established by the 1787 Constitution. The apportionment of seats in the House of Representatives was based on the provisions of Article I, Section 2, Clause 3, of the Constitution. Both chambers had a Pro-Administration majority.  Twelve articles of amendment to the Constitution were passed by this Congress and sent to the states for ratification; the ten ratified as additions to the Constitution on December 15, 1791, are collectively known as the Bill of Rights, with an additional amendment ratified more than two centuries later to become the Twenty-seventh Amendment to the United States Constitution.

Major events

 April 1, 1789: House of Representatives first achieved a quorum and elected its officers.
 April 6, 1789: Senate first achieved a quorum and elected its officers.
 April 6, 1789: The House and Senate, meeting in joint session, counted the Electoral College ballots, then certified that George Washington was unanimously elected President of the United States and John Adams (having received 34 of 69 votes) was elected as Vice President.
 April 21, 1789: John Adams was inaugurated as the nation's first vice president.  
 April 30, 1789: George Washington was inaugurated as the nation's first president at Federal Hall in New York City.
 January 8, 1790: President Washington gave the first State of the Union Address
 June 20, 1790: Compromise of 1790: James Madison agreed to not be "strenuous" in opposition to the assumption of state debts by the federal government; Alexander Hamilton agreed to support a national capital site in the South.

Major legislation

Session 1 
Held March 4, 1789, through September 29, 1789, at Federal Hall in New York City
 June 1, 1789: An act to regulate the time and manner of administering certain oaths, ch. 1, 
 July 4, 1789: Tariff of 1789, ch. 2, 
 July 27, 1789: United States Department of State was established, originally named the Department of Foreign Affairs, ch. 4, .
 July 31, 1789: Regulation of the Collection of Duties on Tonnage and Merchandise, ch.5, which established the  United States Customs Service and its ports of entry.
 August 7, 1789: Department of War was established, ch. 7, .
 September 2, 1789: United States Department of the Treasury was established, ch. 12, 
 September 24, 1789: Judiciary Act of 1789, ch. 20, which established the federal judiciary and the office of Attorney General

Session 2 
Held January 4, 1790, through August 12, 1790, at Federal Hall in New York City
 March 1, 1790: Made provisions for the first Census, ch. 2, 
 March 26, 1790: Naturalization Act of 1790, ch. 3, 
 April 10, 1790: Patent Act of 1790, ch. 7, 
 April 30, 1790: Crimes Act of 1790,  ch. 9, 
 May 31, 1790: Copyright Act of 1790, ch. 15, 
 July 16, 1790: Residence Act, ch. 28, established Washington, D.C., as the seat of government of the United States.
 July 22, 1790: Indian Intercourse Act of 1790, ch. 33, regulated commerce with the Indian tribes.
 August 4, 1790: Funding Act of 1790, ch. 34, authorized the "full assumption" of state debts by the federal government.
 August 4, 1790: Collection of Duties Act, ch.35, among its provisions is Sec. 62, authorizing establishment of the Revenue-Marine, since 1915 the United States Coast Guard.
 August 10, 1790: Tariff of 1790, ch. 39,

Session 3
Held December 6, 1790, through March 3, 1791, at Congress Hall in Philadelphia
 February 18, 1791: Admission of Vermont postdated to March 4, ch. 10, 
 February 25, 1791: First Bank of the United States, ch. 10, 
 March 3, 1791: Tariff of 1791, ch. 15, which triggered the Whiskey Rebellion

Constitutional amendments
 September 25, 1789: Approved 12 amendments to the United States Constitution  establishing specific guarantees of personal freedoms and rights, clear limitations on government power, and submitted them to the state legislatures for ratification. :
 Article one has not been ratified and is still pending before the states.
 Article two was much later ratified on May 7, 1992, as the Twenty-seventh Amendment.
 Articles three through twelve, known as the "Bill of Rights," were later ratified on December 15, 1791.

States ratifying Constitution
 November 21, 1789: North Carolina became the 12th state to ratify the U.S. Constitution and thereby joined the Union.
 May 29, 1790: Rhode Island became the 13th state to ratify the U.S. Constitution and thereby joined the Union.

Territories organized 
 May 26, 1790: Territory South of the River Ohio organized from land ceded by North Carolina.

Party summary

There were no political parties in this Congress. Members are informally grouped into factions of similar interest, based on an analysis of their voting record.

Details on changes are shown below in the "Changes in membership" section.

Senate

During this congress, two Senate seats were added for North Carolina and Rhode Island when each ratified the Constitution.

House of Representatives

During this congress, five House seats were added for North Carolina and one House seat was added for Rhode Island when they ratified the Constitution.

Leadership

Senate
 President: John Adams (P)
 President pro tempore: John Langdon (P)

House of Representatives
 Speaker: Frederick Muhlenberg (P)

Members
This list is arranged by chamber, then by state. Senators are listed by class, and representatives are listed by district.
Skip to House of Representatives, below

Senate
Senators were elected by the state legislatures every two years, with one-third beginning new six-year terms with each Congress. Preceding the names in the list below are Senate class numbers, which indicate the cycle of their election. In this Congress, all senators were newly elected, and Class 1 meant their term ended with this Congress, requiring re-election in 1790; Class 2 meant their term ended with the next Congress, requiring re-election in 1792; and Class 3 meant their term lasted through the next two Congresses, requiring re-election in 1794.

Connecticut
 1. Oliver Ellsworth (P)
 3. William S. Johnson (P)

Delaware
 1. George Read (P)
 2. Richard Bassett (A)

Georgia
 2. William Few (A)
 3. James Gunn (A)

Maryland
 1. Charles Carroll (P)
 3. John Henry (P)

Massachusetts
 1. Tristram Dalton (P)
 2. Caleb Strong (P)

New Hampshire
 2. Paine Wingate (A)
 3. John Langdon (P)

New Jersey
 1. Jonathan Elmer (P)
 2. William Paterson (P), until November 13, 1790
 Philemon Dickinson (P), from December 6, 1790

New York
 1. Philip Schuyler (P), from July 27, 1789
 3. Rufus King (P), from July 25, 1789

North Carolina
 2. Samuel Johnston (P), from November 27, 1789 
 3. Benjamin Hawkins (P), from November 27, 1789

Pennsylvania
 1. William Maclay (A)
 3. Robert Morris (P)

Rhode Island
 1. Theodore Foster (P), from June 25, 1790
 2. Joseph Stanton Jr. (A), from June 25, 1790

South Carolina
 2. Pierce Butler (P)
 3. Ralph Izard (P)

Virginia
 1. William Grayson (A), until March 12, 1790
 John Walker (P), March 31, 1790 – November 9, 1790
 James Monroe (A), from November 9, 1790
 2. Richard Henry Lee (A)

House of Representatives
The names of members of the House of Representatives are listed by their districts.

Connecticut 

All representatives were elected statewide on a general ticket.
 . Benjamin Huntington (P)
 . Roger Sherman (P)
 . Jonathan Sturges (P)
 . Jonathan Trumbull Jr. (P)
 . Jeremiah Wadsworth (P)

Delaware 

 . John Vining (P)

Georgia 

 . James Jackson (A)
 . Abraham Baldwin (A)
 . George Mathews (A)

Maryland 

 . Michael J. Stone (A)
 . Joshua Seney (A)
 . Benjamin Contee (A)
 . William Smith (A)
 . George Gale (P)
 . Daniel Carroll (P)

Massachusetts 

 . Fisher Ames (P)
 . Benjamin Goodhue (P)
 . Elbridge Gerry (A)
 . Theodore Sedgwick (P)
 . George Partridge (P), until August 14, 1790, vacant thereafter
 . George Thatcher (P)
 . George Leonard (P)
 . Jonathan Grout (A)

New Hampshire 

All representatives were elected statewide on a general ticket.
 . Abiel Foster (P), from June 23, 1789
 . Nicholas Gilman (P)
 . Samuel Livermore (A)

New Jersey 

All representatives were elected statewide on a general ticket.
 . Elias Boudinot (P)
 . Lambert Cadwalader (P)
 . James Schureman (P)
 . Thomas Sinnickson (P)

New York 

 . William Floyd (A)
 . John Laurance (P)
 . Egbert Benson (P)
 . John Hathorn (A), from April 23, 1789
 . Peter Silvester (P), from April 22, 1789
 . Jeremiah Van Rensselaer (A), from May 9, 1789

North Carolina 

 . John Baptista Ashe (A), from March 24, 1790
 . Hugh Williamson (A), from March 19, 1790
 . Timothy Bloodworth (A), from April 6, 1790
 . John Steele (P), from April 19, 1790
 . John Sevier (P), from June 16, 1790

Pennsylvania 

All representatives were elected statewide on a general ticket.
 . George Clymer (P)
 . Thomas Fitzsimons (P)
 . Thomas Hartley (P)
 . Daniel Hiester (A)
 . Frederick Muhlenberg (P)
 . Peter Muhlenberg (A)
 . Thomas Scott (P)
 . Henry Wynkoop (P)

Rhode Island 

 . Benjamin Bourne (P), from December 17, 1790

South Carolina 

 . William L. Smith (P), from April 13, 1789
 . Aedanus Burke (A)
 . Daniel Huger (P)
 . Thomas Sumter (A)
 . Thomas Tudor Tucker (A)

Virginia 

 . Alexander White (P)
 . John Brown (A)
 . Andrew Moore (A)
 . Richard Bland Lee (P)
 . James Madison (A)
 . Isaac Coles (A)
 . John Page (A)
 . Josiah Parker (P)
 . Theodorick Bland (A), until June 1, 1790
 William B. Giles (A), from December 7, 1790
 . Samuel Griffin (P)

Changes in membership
There were no political parties in this Congress. Members are informally grouped into factions of similar interest, based on an analysis of their voting record.

New York, North Carolina, and Rhode Island, were the last states to ratify the U.S. Constitution, and because of their late ratification, were unable to send full representation at the beginning of this Congress. Six Senators and nine Representatives were subsequently seated from these states during the sessions as noted.

Senate

There was 1 resignation, 1 death, 1 replacement of a temporary appointee, and 6 new seats. The Anti-Administration Senators picked up 1 new seat and the Pro-Administration Senators picked up 5 new seats.

|-
| New York (3)
| rowspan=4 | New seats
| rowspan=2 style="font-size:80%" | State legislature failed to choose senator until after Congress began.
|  | Rufus King (P)
| July 25, 1789
|-
| New York (1)
|  | Philip John Schuyler (P)
| July 27, 1789
|-
| North Carolina (3)
| rowspan=2 style="font-size:80%" | North Carolina ratified the constitution on November 21, 1789.
|  | Benjamin Hawkins (P)
| rowspan=2 | Elected November 27, 1789
|-
| North Carolina (2)
|  | Samuel Johnston (P)
|-
| Virginia(1)
|  | William Grayson (A)
| style="font-size:80%" | Died March 12, 1790.
|  | John Walker (P)
| Appointed March 31, 1790
|-
| Rhode Island (1)
| rowspan=2 | New seats
| rowspan=2 style="font-size:80%" | Rhode Island ratified the constitution on May 29, 1790.
|  | Theodore Foster (P)
| rowspan=2 | Elected June 7, 1790
|-
| Rhode Island (2)
|  | Joseph Stanton Jr. (A)
|-
| Virginia(1)
|  | John Walker (P)
| style="font-size:80%" | James Monroe was elected to the seat of Senator William Grayson.
|  | James Monroe (A)
| Elected November 9, 1790
|-
| New Jersey (2)
|  | William Paterson (P)
| style="font-size:80%" | Resigned November 13, 1790,having been elected Governor of New Jersey.
|  | Philemon Dickinson (P)
| Elected November 23, 1790
|}

House of Representatives

There was 2 resignations, 1 death, and 6 new seats.  Anti-Administration members picked up 3 seats and Pro-Administration members picked up 2 seats.

|-
| 
|  | Benjamin West (P)
| Member-elect declined to serve and a new member was elected in the first congressional special election.
|  | Abiel Foster (P)
| June 23, 1789
|-
| 
| rowspan=5 | New seats
| rowspan=5 | North Carolina ratified the constitution November 21, 1789.
|  | John Baptista Ashe (A)
| March 24, 1790
|-
| 
|  | Hugh Williamson (A)
| March 19, 1790
|-
| 
|  | Timothy Bloodworth (A)
| April 6, 1790
|-
| 
|  | John Steele (P)
| April 19, 1790
|-
| 
|  | John Sevier (P)
| June 16, 1790
|-
| 
| New seat
| Rhode Island ratified the constitution May 29, 1790.
|  | Benjamin Bourne (P)
| December 17, 1790
|-
| 
|  | Theodorick Bland (A)
| Died June 1, 1790.
|  | William B. Giles (A)
| December 7, 1790
|-
| 
|  | George Partridge (P)
| Resigned August 14, 1790.
| colspan=2 | Remained vacant until next Congress
|}

Committees
Lists of committees and their party leaders.

Senate

 Whole

House of Representatives

 Elections (Chairman: N/A)
 Rules (Select)
 Ways and Means (Chairman: Thomas Fitzsimons)
 Whole

Joint committees

 Enrolled Bills (Chairman: Paine Wingate)

Employees

Senate
 Secretary: Samuel A. Otis, elected April 8, 1789
 Doorkeeper: James Mathers, elected April 7, 1789
 Chaplain:
 Samuel Provoost (Episcopalian), elected April 25, 1789
 William White (Episcopalian), elected December 9, 1790

House of Representatives
 Clerk: John J. Beckley
 Sergeant at Arms: Joseph Wheaton, elected May 12, 1789
 Doorkeeper: Gifford Dalley
 Chaplain:
 William Linn (Presbyterian), elected May 1, 1789
 Samuel Blair (Presbyterian), elected December 10, 1790
 Reading Clerks:  John Beckley.

See also 
 1788–89 United States elections (elections leading to this Congress)
 1788–89 United States presidential election
 1788–89 United States Senate elections
 1788–89 United States House of Representatives elections
 1790 United States elections (elections during this Congress, leading to the next Congress)
 1790–91 United States Senate elections
 1790–91 United States House of Representatives elections

Notes

References

Further reading
 Bickford, Charlene Bangs, and Kenneth R. Bowling. Birth of the nation: the First Federal Congress, 1789–1791 (Rowman & Littlefield, 1989)
 Bordewich, Fergus M. The First Congress: How James Madison, George Washington, and a Group of Extraordinary Men Invented the Government (2016)
 Bowling, Kenneth R. Politics in the first Congress, 1789–1791 (Taylor & Francis, 1990)
 Christman, Margaret C.S. The first federal congress, 1789–1791 (Smithsonian Inst Pr, 1989.)
 Currie, David P. "The Constitution in Congress: Substantive Issues in the First Congress, 1789–1791." The University of Chicago Law Review 61 (1994): 775–865.   online
 Jillson, Calvin C., and Rick K. Wilson. Congressional Dynamics: Structure, Coordination, and Choice in the First American Congress, 1774–1789 (Stanford University Press, 1994)

External links

 1st Federal Congress Project
 Statutes at Large, 1789–1875
 Senate Journal, First Forty-three Sessions of Congress
 House Journal, First Forty-three Sessions of Congress
 Biographical Directory of the United States Congress
 House History from the U.S. House of Representatives
 Statistics & Lists from the U.S. Senate